Galianora is a genus of Ecuadorian jumping spiders that was first described by Wayne Paul Maddison in 2006.  it contains only two species, found only in Ecuador: G. bryicola and G. sacha.

The two described species have quite a different body form: G. sacha is elongate and pale, with raptorial front legs, while G. bryicola is compact and brown. An as-yet undescribed species from Venezuela is intermediate in body form and palp. It is named in honor of arachnologist María Elena Galiano.

References

Salticidae
Salticidae genera
Spiders of South America